

Performers

Awards

Best Spanish Act
Melendi
Auryn
Dani Martín
Pablo Alborán
Malú

Best Spanish New Act
Marien Baker
Xriz
Wally López
Pablo López
El Viaje de Elliot

Best Spanish Video
Dani Martín — Cero
Auryn — Make My Day
Soraya — Con fuego
Pablo Alborán — Quién
Malú — A prueba de ti

Best Spanish Festival, Tour or Concert
Alejandro Sanz — Gira La música no se toca
Melendi — Gira Lágrimas desordenadas
40 Hot Mix Road Show
Pablo Alborán — Gira 2013
Dcode Festival

Best Spanish Album
Pablo Alborán — Tanto
Dani Martín — Dani Martín
Melendi — Lágrimas desordenadas
Malú — Dual
Efecto Pasillo — El misterioso caso de...

Best Spanish Song
Alejandro Sanz — Mi marciana
Melendi — Tu jardín con enanitos
Dani Martín — Cero
Malú & Pablo Alborán — Vuelvo a verte
Pablo Alborán — Tanto

Best International Act
Bruno Mars
One Direction
Pink
Rihanna
Avicii

Best International Album
One Direction — Take Me Home
Rihanna — Unapologetic
Avicii — True
Pink — The Truth About Love
Passenger — All the Little Lights

Best International Song
James Arthur — Impossible
Bruno Mars — Locked Out of Heaven
Avicii — Wake Me Up
Daft Punk — Get Lucky
Robin Thicke — Blurred Lines

Best International New Act
John Newman
James Arthur
Passenger
The Lumineers
Macklemore & Ryan Lewis

Best Latin Act
Ricky Martin
Jesse & Joy
Pitbull
Jennifer Lopez
Cali & El Dandee

Best International Video
Avicii — Wake Me Up
Naughty Boy & Sam Smith — La La La
Macklemore & Ryan Lewis — Can't Hold Us
John Newman — Love Me Again
Bruno Mars — Locked Out of Heaven

Special Awards
 Best rock band: Imagine Dragons
 Career achievement award : Estopa
 Most versatile artist: Dani Martín

References

Spanish music awards
2013 in Spanish music
Latin American music
European music awards
2013 music awards
Los Premios 40 Principales